John P. Sall (born 1948) is an American billionaire businessman and computer software developer, who co-founded SAS Institute and created the JMP statistical software.

Sall grew up in Rockford, Illinois and earned degrees in history, economics and statistics. In 1976, he joined others from North Carolina State University in co-founding SAS Institute, an analytics software company. In the 1980s, Sall and other developers created the JMP statistical software.

Early life
John Sall was born in Rockford, Illinois in 1948. He received a bachelor's degree in history from Beloit College in Beloit, Wisconsin. Sall felt he graduated into a weak job market, so he went to graduate school at Northern Illinois University, where he earned a master's degree in economics. It was at graduate school that Sall became interested in statistics and computer science. He went on to study graduate-level statistics at North Carolina State University, where he received an honorary doctorate in 2003.

Career
James Goodnight was John Sall's mentor at North Carolina State University. In 1976, the two joined others from the University, Anthony James Barr and Jane Helwig, in founding SAS Institute, an analytics software company founded to analyze agricultural data. Sall designed, developed, and documented many of the earliest procedures of the SAS language.

Sall started developing JMP in the 1980s, when the graphical user interface was introduced on the Macintosh. Sall and a small team of developers spent a year and a half working on JMP before version one was released in October 1989. Sall continued to do coding and product development for JMP software for more than 20 years, supporting Windows 3.1, writing the product in different implementation languages, re-writing the product's "nervous system" and improving the JMP scripting language. Today Sall still acts as JMP's chief architect. He also co-authored the book JMP Start Statistics with Ann Lehman and Lee Creighton.

Personal
Sall lives in Cary, North Carolina. He is married and has four children. Sall and his wife are involved in conservation, international health and development, and environmental issues through the Sall Family Foundation. Sall was on the board of The Nature Conservancy from 2002 to 2011, and is a member of the board for the Smithsonian National Museum of Natural History. Sall and his wife also work with the World Wide Fund for Nature (WWF), CARE and other non-profits. They contributed to the founding of Cary Academy, an independent college preparatory school for students grades six through 12. Sall was elected Fellow of the American Statistical Association in 1998 and is a member of the North Carolina State University board of trustees. In 1994, he served as chairman of the Interface Foundation of North America.

Sall owns about one-third of SAS Institute, while Goodnight owns the remainder.  According to Forbes, Sall's net worth was approximately $4.2 billion as of 2016, making him the 392nd richest person in the United States at the time. As of 2009, most of Sall's net worth was illiquid, and based on the estimated worth of his partial ownership in SAS Institute. In 2018, Sall was still working, doing programming, and leading a team of developers.

References

Living people
1948 births
American billionaires
Beloit College alumni
Businesspeople in software
Businesspeople from North Carolina
Giving Pledgers
21st-century philanthropists
North Carolina State University alumni
Northern Illinois University alumni
People from Cary, North Carolina
People from Rockford, Illinois
Fellows of the American Statistical Association
Mathematicians from Illinois